Upper Horton is a very small village and surrounding agricultural area located by the Horton River in northern New South Wales, Australia. The community of Upper Horton lies high in the Horton River Valley. It is accessed from the Fossickers Way with the turnoff 13 km north of Barraba and a journey of 19 km to the village.

The village does not have a school. Children from the area travel to Barraba for school. The Upper Horton district is included within Gwydir Shire  local government area which is centred in Bingara.

The major event of the village is the very popular and highly regarded New Years Day Rodeo.

Upper Horton Post Office opened on 1 September 1899.

References

Towns in New South Wales
Towns in New England (New South Wales)
Gwydir Shire